Little Pal is a 1915 American silent drama film directed by James Kirkwood and starring Mary Pickford. The film was produced by Famous Players Film Company and distributed by Paramount Pictures.

Cast
Mary Pickford as 'Little Pal'
Russell Bassett as Sid Gerue
George Anderson as John Grandon
William Lloyd as 'Pill Box' Andy
Constance Johnston as Frances Grandon
Joseph Manning as 'Black Brand'
Bert Hadley as Cultus

Preservation status
A print is preserved at Cinémathèque Française.

See also
Mary Pickford filmography

References

External links

Lantern slide and lobby poster

1915 films
1915 drama films
Silent American drama films
American silent feature films
American black-and-white films
Famous Players-Lasky films
Films directed by James Kirkwood Sr.
Paramount Pictures films
1910s American films